Solmization is a system of attributing a distinct syllable to each note of a musical scale. Various forms of solmization are in use and have been used throughout the world, but solfège is the most common convention in countries of Western culture.

Overview
The seven syllables normally used for this practice in English-speaking countries are: do, re, mi, fa, sol, la, and ti (with sharpened notes of di, ri, fi, si, li and flattened notes of te, le, se, me, ra).
The system for other Western countries is similar, though si is often used as the final syllable rather than ti.

Guido of Arezzo is thought likely to have originated the modern Western system of solmization by introducing the ut–re–mi–fa–so–la syllables, which derived from the initial syllables of each of the first six half-lines of the first stanza of the hymn Ut queant laxis.  Giovanni Battista Doni is known for having changed the name of note "Ut" (C), renaming it "Do" (in the "Do Re Mi ..." sequence known as solfège). 
An alternative explanation, first proposed by Franciszek Meninski in Thesaurus Linguarum Orientalium (1680) and later by J.-B. Laborde in Essai sur la Musique Ancienne et Moderne (1780), is that the syllables were derived from the Arabic solmization system درر مفصّلات Durar Mufaṣṣalāt ("Separated Pearls") (dāl, rā', mīm, fā', ṣād, lām, tā) during the Middle Ages, but there is not any documentary evidence for it.

Byzantine music uses syllables derived from the Greek alphabet to name notes: starting with A, the notes are  pa (alpha), vu (beta, pronounced v in modern greek), ga (gamma), di (delta), ke (epsilon), zo (zeta), ni (eta).

In Scotland, the system known as Canntaireachd ("chanting"') was used as a means of communicating bagpipe music verbally.

The Svara solmization of India has origins in Vedic texts like the Upanishads, which discuss a musical system of seven notes, realized ultimately in what is known as sargam. In Indian classical music, the notes in order are: sa, re, ga, ma, pa, dha, and ni, which correspond to the Western solfege system.

For Han people's music in China, the words used to name notes are (from fa to mi): 上 (siong or shàng), 尺 (cei or chǐ), 工 (gōng), 凡 (huan or fán), 六 (liuo or liù), 五 (ngou or wǔ), 乙 (yik or yǐ). The system is used for teaching sight-singing.

For Japanese music, the first line of Iroha, an ancient poem used as a tutorial of traditional kana, is used for solmization. The syllables representing the notes A, B, C, D, E, F, G are i, ro, ha, ni, ho, he, to respectively. Shakuhachi musical notation uses another solmization system beginning "Fu Ho U".

Javanese musicians derive syllables from numbers: ji-ro-lu-pat-ma-nem-pi'''. These names derive from one-syllable simplification of the Javanese numerals siji, loro, telu, papat, lima, enem, pitu. ([Pa]pat and pi[tu], corresponding to 4 and 7, are skipped in the pentatonic slendro'' scale.)

See also
Solfège
Kodály method with Curwen hand signs
Numbered musical notation
Shape note
Tonic sol-fa

References

Ear training
Musical notation

et:Silpnimetus